Persa incolorata is a species of deep-sea hydrozoan found in the monotypic genus Persa in the family Rhopalonematidae.

References

Rhopalonematidae
Animals described in 1859